Bag Kobenhavn's kulisser is a 1935 Danish film  directed and written by Arne Weel.

Plot
The little theater lady Eva comes out of a minor accident when her taxi collides with a private car belonging to the wealthy banker Morgan. And out of this otherwise ordinary accident occurs unsuspected complications. Eva dismissed when she is late for the theater sample, and the banker will get nothing about the accident. But when he gets wind of it, he might be persuaded to put money in the crowded theater and save the situation.

Cast
Sam Besekow
Else-Marie
Karl Goos
Arthur Jensen
Sigfred Johansen
Sigurd Langberg
Osa Massen
Clara Østø
Henrik Rechendorff
Ib Schønberg
Olga Svendsen
Bruno Tyron
Erika Voigt
Arne Weel

External links
Bag Københavns kulisser at the Danish Film Database
 

1930s Danish-language films
1935 films
Danish black-and-white films
1935 comedy films
Films directed by Arne Weel
Danish comedy films